China–Republic of the Congo relations refer to the bilateral relations between China and Republic of the Congo. On September 10, 1960, China (then known as the government of the Republic of China on Taiwan) established diplomatic relations with the Republic of the Congo and switch recognition to the People's Republic of China on February 22, 1964, as the sole legitimate government of China.

Aid projects
Both China and the Republic of Congo have donated aid projects to each other. The Chinese government fully funded the construction of a EUR 52 million new parliament in the country. The government of the Republic of Congo funded the construction of the China-Congo Friendship Primary School, a school mostly for Tibetan orphans in Chindu County, Qinghai, after the 2010 Yushu earthquake destroyed the old school.

Development finance
Chinese state owned financial institutions have provided development finance for infrastructure construction in the Republic of Congo. Based on media reports, from 2000 to 2012 there were approximately 25 Chinese financed development finance projects in the country. These projects range from building highways linking Brazzaville and Pointe-Noire to constructing a 120 MW dam to supply power to Brazzaville.

Investments
There are several large investments by Chinese companies in the Republic of Congo. China Gold is pursuing a copper mining joint venture in the country with the Gerald Group, a US-based metals trading company. Canada-based MagIndustries, majority owned by a Chinese shareholder, owns an advanced stage potash project that has stalled due to lack of funding.

Politics
Republic of the Congo was one of 53 countries, that in June 2020, backed the Hong Kong national security law at the United Nations.

References

 
Congo, Republic of the
China